Buno-Bonnevaux is a commune in the Essonne department in Île-de-France in northern France.

Inhabitants of Buno-Bonnevaux are known as Bonnevaliens in French.

See also
Communes of the Essonne department

References

External links
Mayors of Essonne Association 

Communes of Essonne